Nigel Bertrams (born 8 January 1993) is a Dutch professional footballer who plays as a goalkeeper for FC Eindhoven.

Club career
Bertrams was born in Best. He is a youth product of PSV Eindhoven. He made his professional debut as Jong PSV player in the second division on 3 August 2013 against Sparta Rotterdam. He moved to Willem II in summer 2015. In 2017, not having played a single match for Willem II, he made a free transfer to NAC Breda. After one season, he signed with Danish side FC Nordsjælland.

Bertrams was loaned out from Nordsjælland to De Graafschap on 29 January 2019, for the rest of the season. On 27 August 2019, he joined MVV Maastricht.

On 18 August 2020, Bertrams signed a one-year contract with FC Groningen to replace Jan Hoekstra, who had been sent on loan to SC Cambuur. On 1 February 2021, it was announced that Bertrams signed a six-month contract with PEC Zwolle.

On 24 June 2021, he signed a one-year deal with FC Eindhoven.

Personal life
His younger brother Jesse also played for PSV.

References

External links
 
 Voetbal International profile 
 

1993 births
Living people
People from Best, Netherlands
Dutch footballers
Netherlands youth international footballers
Dutch expatriate footballers
Association football goalkeepers
Eredivisie players
Eerste Divisie players
PSV Eindhoven players
Jong PSV players
Willem II (football club) players
NAC Breda players
FC Nordsjælland players
De Graafschap players
MVV Maastricht players
FC Groningen players
PEC Zwolle players
FC Eindhoven players
Dutch expatriate sportspeople in Denmark
Expatriate men's footballers in Denmark
Footballers from North Brabant